This is the complete list of men's Universiade medalists in swimming from 1959 to 2019.

Events

50 m freestyle

100 m freestyle

200 m freestyle

400 m freestyle

800 m freestyle

1500 m freestyle

50 m backstroke

100 m backstroke

200 m backstroke

50 m breaststroke

100 m breaststroke

200 m breaststroke

50 m butterfly

100 m butterfly

200 m butterfly

200 m individual medley

400 m individual medley

4x100 m freestyle

4x200 m freestyle

4x100 m medley relay

10k marathon

See also
List of Universiade medalists in swimming (women)

References

Universiade
Universiade